The 2015 Canterbury City Council election took place on 7 May 2015 to elect members of the Canterbury City Council in Kent, England. This was on the same day as other local elections. It was the first election to be held under new ward boundaries. The Conservative Party retained overall control of the council.

Election result

Results by Ward

Barton

Beltinge

Blean Forest

Chartham and Stone Street

Chestfield

Gorrell

Greenhill

Herne & Broomfield

Heron

Little Stour & Adisham

Nailbourne

Northgate

Reculver

Seasalter

St Stephen's

Sturry

Swalecliffe

Tankerton

West Bay

Westgate

Wincheap

References

2015 English local elections
May 2015 events in the United Kingdom
2015
2010s in Kent